V as in Victim is an album by American keyboardist and composer Wayne Horvitz' band Pigpen recorded in 1993 and released on the Japanese Avant label.

Reception
The Allmusic review by Stephen Thomas Erlewine awarded the album 4 stars stating "Equal parts rock and free jazz, V as in Victim is a weird journey through a number of styles and sounds -- there's some grooves, some soundscapes and some brutally dissonant variations on free jazz. More often than not, the excursions are successful."

Track listing
All compositions by Wayne Horvitz except as indicated
 "Cause I'm in Love Yeah" - 2:21 
 "Speech" - 3:17 
 "A Portrait of Hank Williams Jr." - 5:18 
 "Light This Candle" - 5:55 
 "Testament" - 2:38 
 "V as in Victim" - 8:24 
 "Stompin' at the Cranium" - 4:41 
 "Again" (Bill Frisell) - 5:09 
 "Jazzmaster" - 2:16 
 "Mr. Rogers" - 2:23 
Recorded at Iron Wood Studio in Seattle, Washington in May 1993

Personnel
Wayne Horvitz - keyboards
Briggan Krauss - alto saxophone
Fred Chalenor - electric bass
Mike Stone - drums

References

Avant Records albums
Wayne Horvitz albums
1994 albums